Adriana Sabrina Diaz (born 1984 in New York City) is an American television journalist for CBS News.

Early life and education
Born to Dominican immigrants, at the age of 17 she won the title of Miss New York Teen USA 2003. She competed at Miss Teen USA 2003, held in Palm Springs, California.  That pageant was won by Tami Farrell. Diaz won the Miss New York USA 2006 title in a state pageant held in late 2005. She competed for the title of Miss USA in Baltimore, Maryland on April 21, 2006.  The pageant was won by Miss Kentucky, Tara Conner. Diaz attended Stuyvesant High School in NYC.   She has a BA degree from Princeton University, majoring in public and international affairs and a master's degree in Public Affairs and Public Administration from Columbia University. Before getting her masters, she worked at Goldman Sachs.

Career
Diaz is the anchor of the Saturday edition of the CBS Weekend News. She formerly was the CBS News national correspondent based in Chicago, Illinois, USA. Previously, Diaz was the Beijing-based correspondent for CBS News and has worked as a digital journalist in the network's headquarters in New York City. Prior to that, Diaz had worked for Channel One News, a youth-oriented news program. She was a financial analyst at Goldman Sachs.

Diaz has also filled in as anchor on the CBS 2 Chicago news.

Personal life
In 2020, she married cardiologist Bryan Smith in St. Mary of the Angel’s Church in Chicago.

References

External links 
 Miss New York USA website
 TFTJ Profile
 

American television reporters and correspondents
American women television journalists
CBS News people
School of International and Public Affairs, Columbia University alumni
Stuyvesant High School alumni
Miss USA 2006 delegates
2003 beauty pageant contestants
21st-century Miss Teen USA delegates
American people of Dominican Republic descent
People from the Bronx
1984 births
Living people
American expatriates in China
Goldman Sachs people